Młynisko  is a village in the administrative district of Gmina Biała, within Wieluń County, Łódź Voivodeship, in central Poland.

The village has a population of 560.

See also
Młynisko, Greater Poland Voivodeship (west-central Poland)
Młynisko, Masovian Voivodeship (east-central Poland)
Młynisko, Pomeranian Voivodeship (north Poland)

References

Villages in Wieluń County